The Benson Interruption is a stand-up comedy show on Comedy Central starring Doug Benson. The show was cancelled after one season. The concept of the show was that three stand-up comedians per episode perform their acts in front of an audience, with Benson sitting on a throne by the side of the stage. When the time to present a humorous punch line approaches, Benson interrupted the comic with a comment with the intent of adding to the humor of the joke.

The first season aired on Fridays at midnight on Comedy Central.

History
The Benson Interruption was based on the long-running live stage show Benson hosted for many years in Los Angeles, California. The version shown on Comedy Central consisted of the same format.

Episodes
Every episode featured at least one "tweet-off", where Benson and the current guest read Twitter posts off of their own Twitter accounts in an effort to outdo each other with funny tweets. The entire series was released on a bonus DVD with the album "Potty Mouth."

Podcast episodes
Starting January 21, 2011, unedited live shows of The Benson Interruption became available to download as podcasts.

References

External links
 
 

2010s American late-night television series
2010s American stand-up comedy television series
2010 American television series debuts
2010 American television series endings
Comedy Central original programming
Comedy Central late-night programming